Union Sportive Seme Kraké are a Beninese football club based in Porto-Novo. They currently play in the Benin Premier League for 2014–15 season.

Performance in CAF competitions
CAF Confederation Cup: 1 appearance
2011 – Preliminary Round

Managers
 Raoul Zamba (2006)
 Johnson Ampomah (2007–09)
 Thomas Nana Ampomah (2009)
 Jules Accorsi (2009–10)
 Moussa Latoundji (2010–)

External links
 Official website

 
Krake, USS
Sport in Porto-Novo